Alvania datchaensis is a species of minute sea snail, a marine gastropod mollusk or micromollusk in the family Rissoidae.

Description

Distribution
The holotype of this marine species was found off Turkey.

References

 Amati B. & Oliverio M. (1987). Alvania datchaensis sp. n. (Gastropoda). Notiziario del C.I.S.MA. 9 (10): 46-53

External links
 Bitlis B. & Öztürk B. (2017). The genus Alvania (Gastropoda: Rissoidae) along the Turkish Aegean coast with the description of a new species. Scientia Marina. 81(3): 395-411.

Rissoidae
Gastropods described in 1987